Rabobank Development Team was a professional bicycle racing team, the development team of the former Rabobank team now known as . The team folded after the 2016 season.

Team

2016 
Roster in 2016, age as of 1 January 2016:

2015

Major wins

2004
Dutch National Under-23 Time Trial Championships, Thomas Dekker
2006
Overall Olympia's Tour, Tom Veelers
Prologue, Rick Flens
Stages 6, 7 & 9, Tom Veelers
2007
Ronde van Drenthe, Martijn Maaskant
Overall Tour de Normandie, Martijn Maaskant
Stage 1 (ITT), Lars Boom
Overall Le Triptyque des Monts et Châteaux, Tom Leezer
Stage 2 (ITT), Tom Leezer
Omloop der Kempen, Lars Boom
Overall Olympia's Tour, Thomas Berkhout
Prologue, Stages 4 & 6 (ITT), Lars Boom
Stage 1, Martijn Maaskant
Stage 2, Tom Leezer
Stage 5, Coen Vermeltfoort
Internationale Wielertrofee Jong Maar Moedig, Sven Nys
Overall Tour de l'Avenir, Bauke Mollema
UCI World Under-23 Time Trial Championships, Lars Boom
Münsterland Giro, Jos van Emden
2008
Stage 8 Tour de Normandie, Jos van Emden
Ronde van Drenthe, Coen Vermeltfoort
Stage 1 Rhône-Alpes Isère Tour, Jos van Emden
Stages 1 & 2 Tour de Bretagne, Coen Vermeltfoort
Stages 3 & 6 (ITT) Tour de Bretagne, Lars Boom
Stage 2 Flèche du Sud, Tejay van Garderen
Overall Tour du Haut-Anjou, Dennis van Winden
Stages 1 & 2 (ITT), Dennis van Winden
Overall Olympia's Tour, Lars Boom
Stages 1 & 3, Coen Vermeltfoort
Stages 7 (ITT) & 8, Lars Boom
Paris–Roubaix Espoirs, Coen Vermeltfoort
Overall Volta a Lleida, Lars Boom
Stage 3, Marcel Beima
Stage 5 (ITT), Tejay van Garderen
Stage 6, Lars Boom
Stages 1, 6 (ITT) & 8 Circuito Montañés, Lars Boom
Stage 3 Circuito Montañés, Michel Kreder
 Under-23 Road Race Championships, Lars Boom
Stage 1 Tour Alsace, Michel Kreder
Stage 4 Vuelta Ciclista a León, Lars Boom
Stage 5 Vuelta Ciclista a León, Jos van Emden
Stage 4 Grand Prix Guillaume Tell, Tejay van Garderen
Stage 5 Grand Prix Guillaume Tell, Coen Vermeltfoort
 Under-23 Time Trial Championships, Lars Boom
Stage 3 Tour de l'Avenir, Coen Vermeltfoort
Stage 5 Tour de l'Avenir, Ricardo van der Velde
Stage 5 Tour of Missouri, Boy van Poppel
Stage 10 Tour de l'Avenir, Tejay van Garderen
Stage 2 Cinturó de l'Empordà, Thomas Rabou
2009
Stage 1 (ITT) Istrian Spring Trophy, Dennis van Winden
Stage 4 Istrian Spring Trophy, Michael Van Staeyen
Stage 3 Tour de Normandie, Boy van Poppel
Stage 1 Tour de Bretagne, Dennis van Winden
Ronde van Noord-Holland, Theo Bos
Omloop der Kempen, Theo Bos
Overall Tour du Haut-Anjou, Tejay van Garderen
Overall Olympia's Tour, Jetse Bol
Prologue, team time trial
Stages 1, 2 & 4, Theo Bos
Stage 5, Tejay van Garderen
Stage 4 Circuit de Lorraine, Michel Kreder
Overall Circuito Montañés, Tejay van Garderen
Stage 1, Michel Kreder
 U23 Road Race Championships, Steven Kruijswijk
Stage 2 Vuelta Ciclista a León, Dennis van Winden
Stage 3 Vuelta Ciclista a León, Michael Van Staeyen
 U23 Time Trial Championships, Dennis van Winden
Stage 9 Tour de l'Avenir, Dennis van Winden
2010
Prologue Tour de Normandie, Jetse Bol
Overall Le Triptyque des Monts et Châteaux, Jetse Bol
Stage 2 (ITT), Jetse Bol
Stage 2 Circuit des Ardennes, Tom-Jelte Slagter
Zellik–Galmaarden, Coen Vermeltfoort
Stage 1 Tour de Bretagne, Jetse Bol
Stage 2 Tour de Bretagne, Martijn Keizer
Skandis GP, Tom-Jelte Slagter
Stages 4 & 6 Olympia's Tour, Coen Vermeltfoort
Prologue Circuito Montañés, Martijn Keizer
Thüringen Rundfahrt der U23, Barry Markus
 U23 Road Race Championships, Tom-Jelte Slagter
 U23 Time Trial Championships, Martijn Keizer
Stage 4 Kreiz Breizh Elites, Boy van Poppel
Overall Tour Alsace, Wilco Kelderman
Stage 6, Wilco Kelderman
Ronde van Midden-Nederland, Michel Kreder
2011
Ster van Zwolle, Barry Markus
Dorpenomloop Rucphen, Barry Markus
Overall Le Triptyque des Monts et Châteaux, Tom Dumoulin
Stages 1 & 3 Tour de Bretagne, Jetse Bol
Overall Olympia's Tour, Jetse Bol
Stages 1 & 6, Jetse Bol
Paris–Roubaix Espoirs, Ramon Sinkeldam
Overall Tour of Norway, Wilco Kelderman
Overall Thüringen Rundfahrt der U23, Wilco Kelderman
Stages 5 (ITT) & 6, Wilco Kelderman
 U23 Time Trial Championships, Wilco Kelderman
 U23 Road Race Championships, Ramon Sinkeldam
Stages 2 & 4 Kreiz Breizh Elites, Moreno Hofland
Overall Vuelta Ciclista a León, Marc Goos
Stage 1, Barry Markus
Stage 3, team time trial
Prologue Tour de l'Ain, Wilco Kelderman
Stage 2 Tour de l'Avenir, Moreno Hofland
2012
Prologue Istrian Spring Trophy, Ivar Slik
Stage 2a (ITT) Le Triptyque des Monts et Châteaux, Dylan van Baarle
Arno Wallaard Memorial, Dylan van Baarle
Overall Olympia's Tour, Dylan van Baarle
Prologue, Dylan van Baarle
Stage 2, Jenning Huizenga
Overall Tour de Gironde, Nick van der Lijke
Stage 1, Nick van der Lijke
Stage 1 Thüringen Rundfahrt der U23, team time trial
Stages 2 & 5 Thüringen Rundfahrt der U23, Danny van Poppel
 U23 Road Race Championships, Moreno Hofland
Stage 4 Kreiz Breizh Elites, Moreno Hofland
Stage 1 Vuelta Ciclista a León, Danny van Poppel
Ronde van Midden-Nederland, Ivar Slik
Stage 2 Tour de l'Avenir, Moreno Hofland
 U23 Road Race Championships, Rick Zabel
2013
Beverbeek Classic, Nick van der Lijke
Ster van Zwolle, Dylan van Baarle
Dorpenomloop Rucphen, Dylan van Baarle
Stage 5 Tour de Normandie, Rick Zabel
Ronde van Vlaanderen U23, Rick Zabel
Stage 6 (ITT) Tour de Bretagne, Dylan van Baarle
Overall Olympia's Tour, Dylan van Baarle
Stage 4, Dylan van Baarle
Stage 1 Tour de Gironde, Maarten van Trijp
 U23 Time Trial Championships, Dylan van Baarle
Overall Thüringen Rundfahrt der U23, Dylan van Baarle
 U23 Road Race Championships, Dylan van Baarle
Overall Kreiz Breizh Elites, Nick van der Lijke
Stage 2 (ITT), Nick van der Lijke
Baronie Breda Classic, Mike Teunissen
Round 1 UCI Cyclo-cross World Cup (Valkenberg), Lars van der Haar
2014
Ster van Zwolle, Bert-Jan Lindeman
Stage 1 Le Triptyque des Monts et Châteaux, André Looij
Overall Tour de Bretagne, Bert-Jan Lindeman
Stage 6, André Looij
Paris–Roubaix Espoirs, Mike Teunissen
Stage 2 Kreiz Breizh Elites, André Looij
Stage 3 Kreiz Breizh Elites, Timo Roosen
Stage 4 Kreiz Breizh Elites, Stan Godrie
Overall Tour de l'Ain, Bert-Jan Lindeman
Stage 3, Bert-Jan Lindeman
Rabo Baronie Breda Classic, Mike Teunissen
Paris–Tours Espoirs, Mike Teunissen
2015
Overall Rhône-Alpes Isère Tour, Sam Oomen
Stage 1, Sam Oomen
Stages 2 & 4 (ITT) Tour des Pays de Savoie, Sam Oomen
 U23 Road Race Championships, Stan Godrie
Paris–Tours Espoirs, Sam Oomen
2016
Stage 2 Istrian Spring Trophy, Martijn Tusveld
Flèche Ardennaise, Jeroen Meijers
Overall Rhône-Alpes Isère Tour, Lennard Hofstede
Stage 2, Lennard Hofstede
Stage 1 Ronde de l'Oise, Martijn Budding
Overall Kreiz Breizh Elites, Jeroen Meijers
Overall Olympia's Tour, Cees Bol
Stage 6, Martijn Budding

National champions
2007
  U23 World Championship Time Trial, Lars Boom
2008
  Dutch U23 Road Race Championships, Lars Boom
  Dutch U23 Time Trial Championships, Lars Boom
2009
  Dutch U23 Road Race Championships, Steven Kruijswijk
  Dutch U23 Time Trial Championships, Dennis van Winden
2010
  Dutch U23 Road Race Championships, Tom-Jelte Slagter
  Dutch U23 Time Trial Championships, Martijn Keizer
2011
  Dutch U23 Road Race Championships, Wilco Kelderman
2012
  Dutch U23 Road Race Championships, Moreno Hofland
  German U23 Road Race Championships, Rick Zabel
2013
  Dutch U23 Time Trial Championships, Dylan van Baarle
  Dutch U23 Road Race Championships, Dylan van Baarle

See also
 Blanco Pro Cycling Team
 Rabobank Women Cycling Team

References

Cycling teams based in the Netherlands
Defunct cycling teams based in the Netherlands
Cycling teams established in 1997
Cycling teams disestablished in 2017